Juarez–Lincoln University was part of the Mexican-American education movement in Texas beginning in 1969.  In that year many Latino students walked out in protest over lack of Latino history in secondary schools in Texas, Latino faculty members and related issues.  This led to the start of Jacinto Treviño College in Mercedes, Texas. The concept was initially presented at a plenary session of the Mexican American Youth Organization holding its annual statewide meeting at La Lomita, a building which had been a seminary, just south of Mission, Texas in December 1969.

In 1971 Dr. Leonard Mestas and Andre Guerrero, who had been associated with Jacinto Treviño College, left due to internal differences and founded Juarez–Lincoln University in Fort Worth, Texas, as part of the Antioch Network of study centers. Those of the original group who had left completed their graduate work towards a Masters in Education at the new center. It moved the next year to St. Edward's University in Austin, Texas.  St. Edward's became known for its high rating of faculty personnel and four-year business degree program.  Antioch Juarez-Lincoln center moved to its own Austin campus in 1975 when it had about 1200 students. It received national and regional accreditation from its inception in 1971 until its closure in 1991. Juarez-Lincoln kept its affiliation with Antioch which had a long-standing affiliation with UREHE, the Union for Research and Experimentation in Higher Education. UREHE member institutions were at the forefront of curricular and educational model delivery changes in U.S. institutions of higher learning. Among those changes were the recognition that adult members of society could return to college and receive college level credit for equivalent work experiences. Other variants of the traditional delivery model included the incorporation of supervised independent study and research, and competency based college level learning.
Juarez Lincoln was also the creator and sponsor of a Migrant Education Clearinghouse, and supported other projects such as a Chicana Leadership Development group and the League of United Chicano Artists (LUCHA) which held art expositions at the center.

References

External links

The First Years - HOJAS A Chicano Journal of Education. Juarez-Lincoln University. Juarez-Lincoln Press. Austin, Texas. 1976

Defunct private universities and colleges in Texas
1971 establishments in Texas